Elizabeth Letts is an American author.

Biography 
Elizabeth Letts was born on June 23, 1961, in Houston, Texas. She grew up in Southern California. As a teenager, she was a competitive equestrian three-day eventer. She attended Northfield Mount Hermon School and Yale College where she majored in History. She served in the Peace Corps in Morocco.

She is the author of multiple books: Quality of Care; Family Planning; The Butter Man; The Eighty-Dollar Champion: Snowman the Horse that Inspired a Nation, a #1 New York Times bestseller.;, The Perfect Horse: The Daring U.S. Mission to Rescue the Priceless Stallions Kidnapped by the Nazis, which reached #5 on the New York Times bestseller list; and Finding Dorothy. Elizabeth Letts also writes women's fiction under the pen name Nora Carroll.

Her younger brother, John, is a retired professional tennis player.and her father, J. Spencer Letts was a Federal District Court Judge.

Awards
"The Perfect Horse"
PEN USA Literary Award 2017 for Research Non-Fiction
Best Books of 2016- Amazon Editors
The Eighty-Dollar Champion
Daniel P Lenehan Award for Overall Media Excellence from the United States Equestrian Foundation.
Goodreads Reader's Choice Finalist: Best History and Biography
The Butter Man
Bank Street College's The Best Children's Books of the Year
CCBC Choices Recommended Book
Charlotte Zolotow Highly Commended
Children's Africana Honor Book
Junior Library Guild Selection
Middle East Book Award
NCSS/CBC Notable Social Studies Trade Books for Young People
Peace Corps Writers Award
Storytelling World Award Honor Book for Young Listeners

Works
Family Planning (NAL/Penguin)
Quality of Care (NAL/Penguin)
The Butter Man (Charlesbridge)
The Eighty Dollar Champion: Snowman, the Horse That Inspired a Nation (Random House, Ballantine Books),  2011
The Perfect Horse: The Daring U.S. Mission to Rescue the Priceless Stallions Kidnapped by the Nazis. (Random House, Ballantine Books) August 23, 2016
Finding Dorothy (Random House, Ballantine Books) February 12, 2019

As Nora Carroll
"The Color of Water in July (Lake Union Publishing, 2015)
 "Academy Girls" (Lake Union Publishing, 2015)

References

External links
Official Elizabeth Letts Website

21st-century American novelists
American women novelists
1961 births
Living people
21st-century American women writers
Northfield Mount Hermon School alumni
Yale College alumni
American women non-fiction writers
21st-century American non-fiction writers
Writers from Houston
Novelists from Texas
Peace Corps volunteers